Memramcook-Lakeville-Dieppe was a provincial electoral district for the Legislative Assembly of New Brunswick, Canada.

History
It was created in 2006 as a result the large population increase in the City of Dieppe.  The district was carved largely out of the old riding of Dieppe-Memramcook taking about 1/5 of Dieppe, the village of Memramcook and surrounding areas.  The community of Lakeville was also a part of this riding, having come from the neighbouring district of Moncton Crescent.

Members of the Legislative Assembly

Election results

References

External links 
Website of the Legislative Assembly of New Brunswick

Former provincial electoral districts of New Brunswick
Politics of Dieppe, New Brunswick
2006 establishments in New Brunswick
2013 disestablishments in New Brunswick
Constituencies established in 2006
Constituencies disestablished in 2013